Novillars is a commune in the Doubs department in the Bourgogne-Franche-Comté region in eastern France.

Geography

Population

The opening of a psychiatric hospital in 1968 tripled the population of the village.

See also
 Communes of the Doubs department

References

External links

 Novillars on the intercommunal Web site of the department 

Communes of Doubs